Ne Plus Ultra, is an album by saxophonist Warne Marsh recorded in 1969 and originally released on the Revelation label in 1970 before being rereleased on CD the Swiss HatOLOGY label in 2006 with a bonus track.

Reception 

The Allmusic review noted "This was tenor saxophonist Warne Marsh's first recording as a leader since 1960. ... A strong all-around CD reissue". The Guardians John Fordham rated the album 4 stars out of 5, saying, "A largely unsung classic, originally released in 1969, and featuring the most purist of all the followers of Cool School guru Lennie Tristano's ascetically linear method of jazz improvising. West Coast saxophonist Warne Marsh (like all the Tristanoites) liked staying in a narrow dynamic range, but within it he could perform miracles of melodic invention and rhythmic audacity – though almost always performing the latter over a metronomically steady drummer's groove".  Writing for All About Jazz, Nic Jones stated "The passing of time has done nothing to reduce the singularity of Warne Marsh's art, and this set, recorded at the end of the 1960s, is an excellent working definition".

Track listing 
 "You Stepped Out of a Dream" (Nacio Herb Brown, Gus Kahn) – 9:03
 "Lennie's Pennies" (Lennie Tristano) – 4:21
 "317 East 32nd Street" (Tristano) – 8:15
 "Subconscious-Lee" (Lee Konitz) – 7:15
 "Touch and Go" (Warne Marsh) – 15:22
 "Bach 2 Part Invention No. 13" (Johann Sebastian Bach) – 0:59 Bonus track on CD reissue

Personnel 
Warne Marsh – tenor saxophone
Gary Foster – alto saxophone
Dave Parlato – bass
John Tirabasso – drums

References 

Warne Marsh live albums
1970 live albums
Revelation Records (jazz) live albums
Hathut Records live albums